Búscame is the debut studio album recorded by Cuban-American singer-songwriter and actor Jencarlos Canela. The album was released by Bullseye Records on November 10, 2009 (see 2009 in music). The album features the hit single "Amor Quédate", the theme song from the hit Telemundo telenovela Más Sabe el Diablo. "Búscame" was produced by: Rudy Pérez, a partner in Bullseye Music along with music industry: Rick Stevens and Marco Bissi.

Búscame seems to be the highest album to debut on the Billboard Latin Chart, reaching the #2 spot in the "Latin Pop Albums" in the first week. According to SoundScan.com the albums has sold around more than 8,000 copies.

Singles
Amor Quédate - 3:39
Búscame - 3:15

Track listing

Reception

Allmusic gave the album a three-star rating, and Thom Jurek compared the song "Nadie Como Yo" to E Street Band for the piano arrangements and the drum beat to Juanes. Jurek also pointed that most of the song composition are pop ballads with "Salvame" and "Quiero Despertar" as the best of these.

Charts

Weekly charts

Year-end charts

Credits
 Album Produced by: Rudy Pérez
 Executive Producer: Rick Stevens
 Co-Executive Producer: Marco Bissi
 Arrangements: Rudy Pérez
 Keyboards, Bass, Drums & Percussion Programming: Rudy Pérez
 Electric & acoustic guitars: Rudy Pérez
 Editing & Comp Engineer: Andrés Bermúdez
 Assistant Engineer: David López
 Mastered by: Bruce Weeden
 Recorded/Mixed at: The Record Plant, Los Angeles, California & The Beach House, Miami Beach, Florida
 Design; Package Design & Art Director: Chick Ciccarelli

References

2009 debut albums
Jencarlos Canela albums
Albums produced by Rudy Pérez
Spanish-language albums